The National Pantheon of the Heroes, whose full name National Pantheon of Heroes and Oratory of the Virgin of the Asuncion is a building and landmark of Asunción, Paraguay, and a national monument of Paraguay. It is located between the Palma and Chile streets in the downtown of the capital of Paraguay, and it is considered of great architectural, artistic and cultural heritage.

In October 1863, the then president Francisco Solano López ordered the construction of the chapel of the Virgin of the Asuncion, which was designed by Italian architect Alejandro Ravizza, in collaboration with the builder Giacomo Colombino. But as a result of the War of the Triple Alliance, the building remained unfinished and in scaffolding for over 70 years. Only after the Chaco War in 1936 was able to finish and was inaugurated on October 12 of that year, to become by presidential decree in National Pantheon of Heroes.

The National Pantheon is the mausoleum of the country, where lie the remains of various figures of great significance in Paraguayan history such as Carlos Antonio López (first constitutional president), Francisco Solano López, José Félix Estigarribia (hero of the Chaco War against Bolivia) and his wife. In addition, in the pantheon lie the children martyrs of Acosta Ñu and two Unknown Soldiers, among others.

Within the enclosure of the pantheon have set countless illustrious honorary plaques sent by foreign rulers, kings and princes. Congratulations and verses of appreciation to the Paraguayan Navy, Air Force among others. The front of the pantheon features an inscription in Latin, "Fides et Patria", meaning "My faith and my country."

It is customary in Asuncion that when something historic happens (such as the victory of Fernando Lugo in the 2008 elections) people flock with their flags to the street in front of it and celebrate the event.

The ceremonial changing of the guard is held several times a day.

Gallery

Buildings and structures in Asunción
Cemeteries in Paraguay
Mausoleums
Monuments and memorials in Paraguay
Buildings and structures completed in 1936